Edvin Wilson (born 25 April 1989) is a Swedish cyclist.

Major results

2006
 1st  Road race, National Junior Road Championships
2012
 3rd Scandinavian Race Uppsala
 10th Overall Ronde de l'Oise
2013
 5th Scandinavian Race Uppsala
2014
 1st Arno Wallaard Memorial
2015
 7th Dorpenomloop Rucphen

References

External links

1989 births
Living people
Swedish male cyclists